The BSR Towers are a complex of four towers, two built on opposite sides of Ben Gurion Road, dividing the cities of Bnei Brak and Ramat Gan in Tel Aviv District, Israel, and a third building completed in 2012 on Kinneret Street. Tower 1 is located in Ramat Gan and stands at 98 meters over 24 floors, whilst Tower 2 stands at 121 meters, thus being the tallest building in Bnei Brak with 27 floors. Both buildings were completed in 2004, and were designed by Moore Architects, and subsequently Moore Yaski Sivan Architects after a merger between Moore and Yaski–Sivan. Towers 3 and 4 are inside Bnei Brak.

See also
List of skyscrapers in Israel
Architecture of Israel

References

External links
BSR Tower 1 and Tower 2 at Emporis
Tower 3

Buildings and structures completed in 2004
Skyscraper office buildings in Israel
Twin towers